Pilaki is a Turkish dish. Pilaki or Piłaki may also refer to
Piłaki, Mrągowo County, a settlement in Gmina Sorkwity, Poland
Piłaki Małe, a village in Gmina Budry, Poland
Piłaki Wielkie, a village in Gmina Pozezdrze, Poland
Żery-Pilaki, a village in Gmina Grodzisk, Poland
Olga-Afroditi Pilaki (born 1989), Greek rhythmic gymnast